Human Resource Management Service is a service of the Government of Serbia, established in December 2005 in accordance with the Law on Civil Servants. Its role is to provide continuous support to the reform of public administration in accordance with the principles of professionalization, depoliticization, rationalization and modernization, set out by the Public Administration Reform Strategy, and to ensure the implementation and further development of established standards and procedures in processes that make up Human Potential Management in public administration.

Responsibilities

Human Resource Management Service has the following responsibilities:

 To ensure that job descriptions, the application of established criteria for job evaluation and job classification into grades and types are consistent and uniform in all public administration authorities by giving opinions about staffing table rulebooks.
To prepare for the Government a proposal of the personnel plan for public administration authorities for each fiscal year and to ensure proper implementation of the adopted personnel plan.
 To publish on its website competitions for job openings in public administration.
	To take part in selection panels which conduct competitions to fill vacancies in public administration and to ensure proper conduct of the competitions.
	To test knowledge, skills and abilities of competing participants.
	To maintain the Central Personnel Registry as a database of public administration staff.
	To maintain the internal labour market, help civil servants with their transfer and assist authorities in solving their staffing needs.
	To make reports on the annual assessment of civil servants and suggest measures for the standardization of the methods for determining marks.
	To perform specialist and technical work for the High Civil Service Council and the Government Appeals Board.

Internal organization

Human Resource Management Service is managed by the director of the service, who is responsible for his work to the secretary general of the Government of Serbia.

There are three sectors, divided in two subunits.

References

Government agencies of Serbia
2005 establishments in Serbia
Human resource management
Civil services